Morgan Brown may refer to:

Morgan Welles Brown (1800–1853), American judge
Morgan Brown (actor) (1884–1961), American film actor
Morgan Brown (footballer, born 1995) (born 1995), Filipino footballer
Morgan Brown (footballer, born 1999) (born 1999), English footballer